Lucius Volusius Saturninus was a Roman Senator who lived in the 1st century. He served as an ordinary consul in 87, as the colleague of the emperor Domitian. He is known entirely from inscriptions.

Saturninus was of patrician status, one of three known children of Quintus Volusius Saturninus and his wife Nonia Torquata; the others included Quintus Volusius Saturninus, consul of 92, and Volusia Torquata. According to inscriptional evidence, his wife was a patrician named Licinia Cornelia. Licinia and Saturninus had a son called Lucius Volusius Torquatus.

References

Sources
B. Jones, The Emperor Domitian (Google eBook), Routledge, 2002
J. Rüpke, Fasti sacerdotum, Franz Steiner Verlag, 2005

1st-century Romans
Imperial Roman consuls
Roman patricians
Saturninus, Lucius (consul 87)